Ramakrishna Nagar is a residential locality in southern Mysuru, Karnataka.  The inner part of the area is called the Andolana Circle or the Andolana intersection. It borders Kuvempunagar and Vivekanandanagar.

See also
 Kuvempunagar
 Dattagalli
 Vivekananda Nagar

Image gallery

References

Mysore South
Suburbs of Mysore